BPS, Bps or bps may refer to:

Science and mathematics
Plural of bp, base pair, a measure of length of DNA
Plural of bp, basis point, one one-hundredth of a percentage point - ‱
Battered person syndrome, a physical and psychological condition found in victims of abuse
Best practice statement, a qualification of a method used in guidelines documents
Bisphenol S, an organic chemical compound
Bladder pain syndrome, a disorder characterised by pain associated with urination
Bogomol'nyi–Prasad–Sommerfield bound, a mathematical concept in field and string theory
Bogomol'nyi–Prasad–Sommerfield state, solutions saturating the BPS bound
BPS domain, a protein domain
Bronchopulmonary sequestration, where a section of lung tissue has a decreased blood supply
Bovine papular stomatitis, a zoonotic farmyard pox

Computing
IBM Basic Programming Support, BPS/360
Bits per second (bps), a data rate unit
Bytes per second (Bps), a data rate unit
Bits per sample (bps), referring to color depth

Organizations
Badan Pusat Statistik, Indonesian statistical survey institute
Banco de Previsión Social, Uruguayan state-owned social security institute
Barbados Postal Service, national postal agency of Barbados
Biophysical Society, scientific society
Bosnian-Herzegovinian Patriotic Party-Sefer Halilović, a mayor Bosnian political party
Botswana Prison Service, corrections agency of Botswana
British Psychological Society, the representative body for psychologists and psychology in the United Kingdom
British Pteridological Society, the focal point for fern enthusiasts throughout the United Kingdom
Buddhist Publication Society, a charity aiming to spread the teachings of Buddha
Board of Pharmacy Specialties, a certification agency for specialized pharmacists

Education
Belilios Public School, a government secondary school in Hong Kong
Bismarck Public Schools, North Dakota, US school district 
Boston Public Schools, a school district in Boston, Massachusetts, United States
British Parachute Schools, a parachuting drop zone in Nottinghamshire, England
Brockton Public Schools, the school district serving Brockton, Massachusetts, US
Birmingham City School District or Birmingham Public Schools,  Michigan, US
Birla Public School, Pilani, Rajasthan, India
Brainerd Public Schools, Brainerd, Minnesota, US

Other uses
Bachelor of Professional Studies, an undergraduate degree
Battle Programmer Shirase, an anime television series
Baltic Pipeline System, an oil transport system in Western Europe
Biopsychosocial model, an interdisciplinary model that examines the interconnection between biology, psychology, and socio-environmental factors
Porto Seguro Airport, Brazil, IATA code
Basic Pay Scale, public sector term for the grade of an official in Pakistan
BPS grade tea
BLAST Pro Series, a Counter-Strike: Global Offensive tournament

See also
 BP (disambiguation) (for BPs)